Cyclophora indecisa is a moth in the  family Geometridae. It is found in New Guinea and on Seram, Peninsular Malaysia, Borneo and Luzon in the Philippines. The habitat consists of lower montane forests.

References

Moths described in 1907
Cyclophora (moth)
Moths of Asia